Jerome Okon Nriagu is a Nigerian-born, American environmental chemist, academic and researcher. He is Professor Emeritus in the School of Public Health at the University of Michigan. He was formerly a Research Scientist at Environment Canada in the former National Water Research Institute, Burlington, Ontario, and an Adjunct Professor in the Department of Earth Sciences, University of Waterloo, Canada.

Nriagu has published over 30 books and 340 journal articles and is one of the most cited researchers in the field of environmental studies. He is a leading expert in the study of the cycling of heavy metals in the natural and contaminated environments, and the influence on human health. His field of research is transdisciplinary and covers water quality, exposure assessment, environmental risk management, and environmental justice.

Nriagu is the former Editor-in-Chief of the Science of the Total Environment and has served on the editorial boards of many journals. He is the Editor-in-Chief of Encyclopedia of Environmental Health in 7 volumes published by Elsevier in 2019 and was the Founding Editor of the book series, Topics in Environmental Health.

Education 
Nriagu graduated with a B.Sc. (Honors) degree in Geology from the University of Ibadan in Nigeria in 1965. He did his graduate training in low-temperature geochemistry with an MS degree from the University of Wisconsin in 1967 and his Ph.D. in 1970, from the University of Toronto in Canada. In 1987, he received the first academic research D.Sc. degree ever awarded by the University of Ibadan for an outstanding body of work in the field of Environmental Biogeochemistry.

Career 
After his Ph.D., Nriagu joined the Federal Canadian Department of the Environment at National Water Research Institute in Ontario as a Research Scientist in 1972. He subsequently moved to the United States in 1993 and joined the University of Michigan’s School of Public Health as a Professor of Environmental Chemistry in the Department of Environmental & Industrial Health. He was subsequently appointed a Research Professor at Center for Human Growth & Development and as a Faculty Associate at the Center for Afro-American and African Studies at the University. In 2013, he retired and became Professor Emeritus at School of Public Health and Research Professor Emeritus at Center for Human Growth & Development.

Research 
Nriagu’s contributions to science center around three main domains of environmental metal pollution: sources, behavior, fate and influence of toxic metals in the natural and contaminated environments; environmental justice within the framework of exposure assessment and health effects of toxic metals; and specific problems of environmental metal pollution in the developing countries. His research on emissions of trace metals from natural and anthropogenic sources at the local, regional and global scales is the most widely recognized and cited.

Behavior of toxic metals in the environment 
Nriagu’s contributions to knowledge in this area include first quantitative assessment of the worldwide contamination of the air, water and soils with heavy metals published in two influential papers in Nature; environmental chemistry of heavy metal phosphates which led to a technology for in-situ immobilization of lead in contaminated sites; first use of isotopic methods in fingerprinting  the  sources of the sulfur in the Great Lakes basin and the origin of lead in chocolates and cocoa products as well as the Great Lakes; in-depth studies of the behavior, fate and health risks associated with pollutant trace metals in lake ecosystems including the North American Great Lakes. His study of the history of environmental metal pollution led to the book, ‘Lead and Lead Poisoning in Antiquity and the evidence which implicates lead poisoning as a contributing factor in the decline of the Roman Empire. This hhypothesis has been widely mentioned in the popular press and remains a topic of heated debate in the scientific literature.

Exposure assessment and environmental injustice 
Nriagu has made significant contributions in the development of advanced analytical protocols and in the study of the biomarkers of exposure and effects of various metals using body fluids and tissue sample; behavior of trace metals in the human oral environment; and forms of arsenic in groundwater and their influence on human carcinogenesis. The understanding of the forms of heavy metals in foods (especially rice) and their health implications have also been advanced in his studies.

Nriagu has contributed to knowledge on health disparities through his research on disproportionate exposure and poisoning of children with lead in many communities including the Arab-American and Black children in Detroit, the City of Saginaw, Michigan, the ger (peri-urban) communities of Mongolia squatter camps of south-central Durban, South Africa, and several urban areas of Nigeria. He has also conducted extensive studies of asthma prevalence and severity and their association with social, cultural and economic risk factors in the same communities as well as in Taipei in Taiwan. These studies were among the first to show significant positive association between childhood lead poisoning and asthma.

Growing threat of metal poisoning in developing countries 
Nriagu was among the first researchers to draw attention to emerging health risks associated with toxic metal pollution in Africa and publish on the legacy pollution in South America from massive quantities of mercury used in production of silver and gold during colonial times. In addition to childhood asthma and lead poisoning, his research has addressed other specific threats of metal pollution in the developing countries including Brazil (mercury in fish from artisanal gold mining), Ghana (mercury pollution and poisoning in gold mining communities), Lake Victoria (bioaccumulation of mercury in fish), South Africa (decline in children’s blood lead in response to the phase-out of leaded gasoline), Nigeria (water quality, prenatal mercury exposure, and health effects of oil pollution in the Niger Delta), Lebanon (environmental exposures to heavy metals and male infertility),  India (exposure risks of arsenic in groundwater and local foods), Mongolia (multiple metal contamination of ground water), and Jamaica (natural contamination of local food chain with high levels of toxic metals in the soil).

Awards and honors 
1992 – Elected a Fellow of the Royal Society of Canada (FRSC)
2002 - Senior Fulbright Fellowship at the University of the West Indies, Jamaica
2008 - Humboldt Prize
2012 - Lifetime Achievement Award, International Conferences on Heavy Metals in the Environment
2016 - Honorary Doctor of Science Degree, University of Alberta

Bibliography 
The Biogeochemistry of Mercury in the Environment (1979) 
Nickel in the Environment (Advances in Environmental Science and Technology) (1980) 
Cadmium in the Environment (1981) 
Lead and Lead Poisoning in Antiquity (1983) 
Toxic Metals in the Atmosphere (1986) 
Chromium in the Natural and Human Environment (1988) 
Arsenic in the Environment (1994)   
Vanadium in the Environment (19xxx) 
Thallium in the Environment (1998) 
Mineral Components in Foods (Chemical & Functional Properties of Food Components) (2007) 
Trace Metals and Infectious Diseases (2015)

References 

Living people
University of Michigan faculty
Academic staff of the University of Waterloo
University of Ibadan alumni
University of Wisconsin–Madison alumni
University of Toronto alumni
1942 births